Coleophora albidorsella is a moth of the family Coleophoridae. It is found in Iran, the Palestinian Territory, the United Arab Emirates and the Canary Islands (Fuerteventura, La Palma).

References

albidorsella
Moths described in 1942
Moths of Africa
Moths of Asia